Black Sheep Boy Appendix is the fourth EP by indie band Okkervil River, released on November 22, 2005. This mini-album is a continuation of their 2005 release, Black Sheep Boy and is a compilation of unfinished and reworked songs from that album. The disc also includes "Another Radio Song," a re-recorded and lyrically altered version of "For the Captain," a song featured on the band's 1999 debut release, Stars Too Small to Use. "Black Sheep Boy #4" is a re-recorded and lyrically altered version of "Disfigured Cowboy," originally released on the Comes With a Smile issue #11 CD sampler, and was played on an episode ("One Night") of Cold Case.

The definitive double-disc CD version contains a video for "No Key No Plan," directed by Will Sheff.

Track listing

Personnel
 Will Sheff - Vocals, Acoustic Guitar, Electric Guitar, Harmonica, Toy Piano, Toy Guitar, Pump Organ, Wurlitzer, Hammond M1
 Scott Brackett - Trumpet, Tambourine, Handclaps
 Brian Cassidy - Vocals, String Arrangement
 Howard Draper - Bass
 Chris Heinrich - Pedal Steel
 Jonathan Meiburg - Vocals, Pump Organ, Wurlitzer, 12-String Guitar
 Travis Nelsen - Drums, Tambourine, Shaker, Handclaps
 Patrick Pestorius - Bass, Handclaps
 Zachary Thomas - Bass, Handclaps
 Seth Warren - Electronics, Tambourine
 Amy Annelle - Vocals
 Elaine Barber - Harp
 Brian Beattie - Bowed Bass, Hammond Chord Organ
 Jennifer Bourianoff - Violin
 Jonathan Dexter - Cello
 Sara Driver - Viola
 Carrie Miller - Cello
 Michalis Koutsoupides - violin
 Alice Spencer - Mellotron
 Kimberly Burke - Handclaps
 Hot Tub Callahan - Handclaps
 Evan A. Castillo - Handclaps
 David Dalrymple - Handclaps
 Dan Franke - Handclaps
 Eric Katerman - Handclaps
 Renata Limon - Handclaps
 Linda Marie Martinez - Handclaps
 Amy Millangue - Handclaps
 Stacee Millangue - Handclaps
 Elizabeth Thomas - Handclaps
 Graham Thomas - Handclaps
 Heather L. Thompson - Handclaps

References

2005 EPs
Okkervil River albums
Jagjaguwar albums